Abbaye Airport  is an airport serving the town of Boghé in Mauritania.

See also
Transport in Mauritania

References

Sources 
 OurAirports - Mauritania
  Great Circle Mapper - Abbaye
 Abbaye
 Google Earth

External links

Airports in Mauritania